Ashoka Chakravarthy is a 1989 Telugu-language action film produced by Smt. Kaaja Venkataravamma under the Sri Venkateswara Art Productions banner and directed by S. S. Ravi Chandra. It stars Nandamuri Balakrishna, Bhanupriya, Bhagyalakshmi (actress),  and music composed by Ilaiyaraaja. The film was a remake of the Mohanlal-starring Malayalam film Aryan with several changes to suit the audience.

Plot 
Vedam Venkata Ashok is an orthodox traditional Brahmin, who works as a priest in a temple. Urmila and Ashok are in love. But Urmila's father Shanmukha Sastry has betrayed Ashok's father Vedam and is trying to seize their whole property, pushing them below the poverty line. Adiseshayya and Shanmukha Sastry had planned together and had declared Ashok a thief and had him sent to jail. After returning from jail, Ashok's father restricted him from entering the house. Ashok has now decided to go to a safe place and earn a lot of money so that he can again hold up his family's pride. In this situation, he comes across Karim Sahab in Bombay and gets involved in illegal and corrupt activities in the city. By doing all this, Ashok becomes Ashoka Chakravarthy and earns money, but will he be able to regain his parents' confidence and their love, for whom he had jumped into such trouble?

Cast 

Nandamuri Balakrishna as Ashok
Bhanupriya as Urmila
Bhagyasri as Anarkali
Suparna Anand as Preeti
Satyanarayana as Karim Saheb
Gollapudi Maruti Rao as Shanmukha Shastri
Sharat Saxena as Majid Khan
Pradeep Shakthi as Police Inspector
Ranganath as ACP Rohin Albert
Subhalekha Sudhakar as Johnson
Harish as Salim
J. V. Somayajulu
P. L. Narayana as Abdullah
Narra Venkateswara Rao as Aadi Sheshaiah
Chalapathi Rao as Krishniah
Vankayala Satyanarayana as Subba Rao
Eeswar Rao as Krishna Moorti
Tata Appa Rao
Vijaya Rangaraju
Anjali Devi as Meenakshi
Tatineni Rajeswari as Alivelu
Jyothi as Rukmini
Indira as Gayatri

Soundtrack 

Music composed by Ilaiyaraaja. Lyrics written by Veturi. Music released on Echo Audio Company.

References

External links 

1989 films
Telugu remakes of Malayalam films
Films scored by Ilaiyaraaja
1980s Telugu-language films